Blackstone Edge Reservoir is a reservoir in the  Metropolitan Borough of Rochdale, Greater Manchester, England. It is close to Blackstone Edge and the border with Calderdale, West Yorkshire.

References

Reservoirs in Greater Manchester